Rony Martias (born August 4, 1980 in Basse-Terre, Guadeloupe) is a French road bicycle racer for the UC Cholet 49 amateur team.

After  folded at the end of the 2013 season, Martias returned to the amateur ranks with UC Cholet 49.

Career highlights 

2002
 2nd, Paris – Mantes-en-Yvelines, U23
2003
 1st, Prologue, Tour de la Guadeloupe
2005
 141st, Overall, Giro d'Italia
2006
 1st, Stage 1, Tour de Picardie, Péronne
2008
 1st, Overall, Tour Ivoirien de la Paix
 1st, Points classification
 1st, Sprints classification
 3rd, Overall, La Tropicale Amissa Bongo
 1st, Stages 1 & 4 (Franceville & Kango)

References

External links 

Profile at Bouygues Télécom official website

French male cyclists
French people of Guadeloupean descent
Guadeloupean male cyclists
Tour de Guadeloupe stage winners
1980 births
Living people